Lashibi is a town in the Greater Accra Region of southeastern Ghana near the capital Accra. Lashibi is the twentieth-largest settlement in Ghana, in terms of population, with a population of 78,539 people.

See also 
 Railway stations in Ghana

References

External links 
 MSN Map

Populated places in the Greater Accra Region